Jean-François Millot (born 16 November 1944) is a French sprint canoer who competed from the late 1960s to the mid-1970s. Competing in three Summer Olympics, he earned his best finish of fifth in the C-2 500 m event at Montreal in 1976.

References
Sports-reference.com profile

1944 births
Canoeists at the 1968 Summer Olympics
Canoeists at the 1972 Summer Olympics
Canoeists at the 1976 Summer Olympics
French male canoeists
Living people
Olympic canoeists of France